Sharada is a 1957 Indian Hindi-language film directed by L. V. Prasad. The film stars Raj Kapoor and Meena Kumari. The music was composed by C. Ramchandra.

The film did "above average" business and was the ninth-highest-grossing film at the Indian Box Office in 1957. It is a remake of 1954 Tamil film Edhir Paradhathu. Although that year Nargis was awarded Filmfare Best Actress Award for Mother India, Kumari was  awarded the Best Actress award by the Bengal Film Journalists' Association Awards. Raj Kapoor and Meena Kumari later worked together in Char Dil Char Rahen (1959).

Plot
Shekhar, also called Chiranjeev, is a wealthy young man who lives with his father, Kashiram and three siblings: two sisters, one of whom is dumb, and a younger brother. While on a trip, one of his friends, Mohan, falls ill due to alcohol and is treated at an Ashram. This is where Shekhar meets an employee, Sharada, who is poor and lives with her father, Ram Sharan. Shekhar and Sharada fall in love with each other and he promises to get his father's permission and return to marry her. On his way home he has an accident and though he does survive after being treated by tribal people, he returns to the Ashram several days later and is informed that Sharada is now married to a wealthy and much older man. Heart-broken and devastated, Shekhar returns home only to get another shock: the man Sharada has married is none other than his very own father. Depressed and deeply frustrated, he takes to alcohol in a big way. Sharada talks him out of this, he repents and on her insistence, marries Chanchal, who comes from a reputed family. Things then get complicated when Chanchal finds that her husband and his stepmother had been in love before and may not have gotten over their feelings for each other.

Cast
 Raj Kapoor as Shekhar / Chiranjeev
 Meena Kumari as Sharada
 Shyama as Chanchal
 Anita Guha as Padma
 Agha as Ganesh
 Gope as Hukamdas
 Raj Mehra as Kashiram
 Randhir as Munim
 Manorama as Laajo
 Vinod Mehra as Shekhar's Brother 
 Rajan Haksar as Gurudev
 W. M. Khan
 Mirajkar
 Uma Khosla as Padma
 Baby Sultana as young Sharada
 Om Prakash as Mohan
Dance
Sai-Subbalaxmi as Tribal Dancers / Singers

Awards
Filmfare Best Supporting Actor Award - Raj Mehra
Filmfare Best Supporting Actress Award - Shyama
Filmfare Best Editing Award - Shivaji Awdhut

Music
The music is composed by C. Ramchandra, with lyrics authored by Rajinder Krishan.

References

External links

1957 films
1950s Hindi-language films
Films directed by L. V. Prasad
Films scored by C. Ramchandra
Hindi remakes of Tamil films